Indian Hill Cemetery is a historic rural cemetery located at 383 Washington Street in Middletown, Connecticut on a hill adjacent to Wesleyan University.

History
The hill was originally named "Wunne Wah Jet" by the indigenous Wangunk people who lived in Middletown. Sowheage, a grand sachem in the tribe, built fortifications on the hill around 1639 to protect against enemy tribes and European settlers. Over time, the Wangunk sold much of the surrounding land to settlers but kept the hill parcel for themselves. The Wangunk and settlers lived peacefully together for many decades but the hill parcel was eventually sold to settlers in the late 1700s.

The cemetery was developed as part of the City Beautiful movement which promoted the development of rural environments and landscapes for public spaces including cemeteries. After the yellow fever epidemic of 1841, rural cemeteries were thought to be more hygienic since they were located on the outskirts of cities.

The Indian Hill Cemetery was organized June 11, 1850, under a general act of legislation passed in 1841. The cemetery was dedicated on September 30, 1850, and became the burial site of choice for Middletown's elite.

Russell Chapel

The brownstone gothic revival Russell Chapel was built in 1867. Samuel Russell was a businessman who owned the Russell & Company trading business in Canton, China. He was the first president of the Indian Hill Cemetery Association and the chapel was built by his wife in his memory.

The chapel houses the original bell forged at the Troy, New York Meneely Bell Foundry in 1868.

The chapel is listed on the Connecticut Register of Historic Places.

Notable burials

 Joseph Wright Alsop IV (1876–1953), politician and insurance executive
 Joseph Wright Alsop V (1910–1989), journalist
 Stewart Alsop (1914–1974), newspaper columnist and political analyst
 Wilbur Olin Atwater (1844–1907), chemist known for his studies of human nutrition and metabolism
 Everett Bacon (1890–1989), college football quarterback
 Raymond E. Baldwin (1893–1986), 72nd and 74th Governor of Connecticut
 Owen Vincent Coffin (1836–1921), 56th Governor of Connecticut
 Morris B. Crawford (1852–1940), first professor of physics at Wesleyan University
 John Kenneth Galbraith (1908–2006), economist
 Samuel Dickinson Hubbard (1799–1855), U.S. Representative from Connecticut
 William Stone Hubbell (1837–1930), U.S. Civil War Medal of Honor recipient
 Ebenezer Jackson Jr. (1796–1874), U.S. Representative from Connecticut
 William Manchester (1922–2004), author, biographer and historian
 Joseph K. Mansfield (1803–1862), Union General during the U.S. Civil War
 Sigmund Neumann (1904–1962), political scientist and sociologist
 James Timothy Pratt (1802–1887), U.S. Representative from Connecticut
 William North Rice (1845–1928), geologist, Methodist minister, theologian
 Samuel L. Warner (1828–1893), U.S. Representative from Connecticut
 Frank B. Weeks (1854–1935), 64th Governor of Connecticut

References

External links
 Official website
 

1850 establishments in Connecticut
Cemeteries established in the 1850s
Cemeteries in Middlesex County, Connecticut
 
Rural cemeteries